Wang Ping (died 248), courtesy name Zijun, was a military general of the state of Shu Han in the Three Kingdoms period of China. Originally a military officer serving under the warlord Cao Cao in the late Eastern Han dynasty, in 218 he defected to Cao Cao's rival Liu Bei, who later became the founding emperor of Shu, during the Hanzhong Campaign. Though he was a talented orator, Wang Ping never learned to read because he joined the army at a young age. Yet he did not let this disadvantage stop him and had his clerk help him with his reports. Known for his self discipline, he steadily rose through the ranks to become a senior general. During his career, he defeated Zhang He, quelled Wei Yan's alleged rebellion and was the leading commander of the Shu forces during the Battle of Xingshi. The highest position he reached was Senior General Who Guards the North.

Early life
Wang Ping was from Dangqu County, Baxi Commandery, which was around present-day Qu County, Sichuan. Both he and another Shu Han general, Ju Fu were natives from the same commandery of Baxi. He was raised by his maternal family, whose family name was He, so he was also known as He Ping. He presumably changed his family name back to Wang in his later years because historical records show no consistency in recording his name. It could also be possible that his name was changed to Wang Ping posthumously.

Service under Cao Cao
Wang Ping had good relations with the local tribes of Baxi and started his career under their leaders Du Huo and Pu Hu (朴胡). In 215, after his defeat against Cao Cao, Zhang Lu fled to them for help and better surrendering terms with Cao Cao. After Zhang Lu's surrender, Cao Cao had Du Huo and Pu Hu promoted to marquise with the mission of defending Badong (巴東) and Baxi (巴西) commanderies. However Du Huo and Pu Hu failed their mission and were defeated by Huang Quan and had to abandon Ba. After this, Wang Ping accompanied them to visit the Han imperial court, Luoyang where he was appointed as an acting colonel under Xiahou Yuan.

In 217, when Cao Cao's rival Liu Bei launched a campaign to seize control of the strategic Hanzhong Commandery, Wang Ping fought with Cao Cao's forces as a subordinate of Du Huo to counter Liu Bei's invasion. Around 218, when the situation became highly unfavourable for Cao Cao's side because they were running short of supplies, many of Cao Cao's soldiers started defecting to Liu Bei's side, which could provide food and shelter to them. Wang Ping was one of them.

Service under Shu
Liu Bei welcomed Wang Ping and appointed him as a Major-General. During his 10 years of service under Liu Bei and later under Liu Bei's son and successor Liu Shan, Wang Ping did not make any recorded significant achievements.

In 228, when Zhuge Liang, the Imperial Chancellor of Shu, launched the first of a series of military campaigns against Shu's rival state Cao Wei (founded by Cao Cao's son Cao Pi), Wang Ping served as a subordinate of the Shu general Ma Su, who led the vanguard force to attack the enemy at the Battle of Jieting. As Ma Su's subordinate, Wang Ping advised his superior against camping on top of a hill away from water sources. Although Ma Su rejected Wang Ping's advice, he still put Wang Ping in command of a detachment of troops and let him set up a camp below the hill. As Wang Ping foresaw, the Wei general Zhang He led his troops to cut off the Shu army's access to water sources and surround them on the hill.

Upon receiving news of Ma Su's dire situation, Wang Ping led his 1,000 troops to the hill and ordered them to beat their drums loudly to create the impression that reinforcements had arrived. Zhang He probably mistook the drum sounds as a signal for ambush units, so he did not attack in Wang Ping's direction and pulled back. Wang Ping was thus able to regroup Ma Su's remaining troops and gather the Shu army's scattered supplies. In the aftermath of the loss of Jieting, Zhuge Liang had Ma Su executed for his blunder but Wang Ping actions were met with honour and praise. Zhuge Liang appointed Wang Ping to Army Advisor with the mission to manage the five divisions and also the camp affairs. Hence, thanks to his courage, Wang Ping was promoted to the rank of General Who Attacks Bandits (討寇將軍) and given a fief as a Village Marquis.

In 231, when Zhuge Liang launched the fourth campaign against Wei, he tasked Wang Ping with greater responsibilities by ordering him to guard a hill located south of a Shu fortress at Lucheng. When the fortress came under attack, the Wei general Zhang He led his men to attack Wang Ping, but Wang Ping firmly defended his position and managed to hold off the attack and then drive back Zhang He.

After Zhuge Liang's death in 234, Wei Yan and Yang Yi entered into a power struggle with Wei Yan blocking the retreat route of the Shu forces to keep up the fight against Wei. When they met in battle Yang Yi ordered him to lead the soldiers, before the battle started Wang Ping came forward and called out to Wei Yan: "His Excellency (Zhuge Liang) had just died and his body had yet to turn cold, and now you dare to do something like this!". Wei Yan's soldiers knew that he was in the wrong and so wouldn't follow his orders; they soon scattered.

For his effort in quelling Wei Yan's alleged mutiny, Wang Ping received credit and was appointed as the Administrator of Hanzhong (漢中太守) under the supervision of a senior Shu general, Wu Yi. Following Wu Yi's death in 237, Wang Ping replaced him as the general who was overall-in-charge of military affairs in Hanzhong Commandery which put him in charge of the most important defensive location of Shu against the rival state of Wei. The Shu emperor Liu Shan also enfeoffed Wang Ping as the Marquis of Anhan (安漢侯).

After that, the General in Chief Jiang Wan wanted to start an invasion of Wei by an alternative route and he named Wang Ping as the Vanguard Protector of the Army (前護軍). Jiang Wan was also given Wang Ping responsibility to manage his office affairs and staff. In 243, however due to his poor health, Jiang Wan had to abandon his plan for a large campaign against Wei and relocate his base to Fu County (涪縣; present-day Mianyang, Sichuan) yet he did promote Wang Ping to Vanguard Supervisor of the Army (前監軍) and Senior General Who Guards the North (鎮北大將軍).

Battle of Xingshi

The next year, 244 saw Wang Ping's greatest victory. The Wei regent Cao Shuang led more than 100 000 soldiers to attack Hanzhong Commandery. While Hanzhong Commandery had less than 30 000 men and Wang Ping's subordinates, feeling intimidated by the sheer size of the enemy force in comparison to them, urged their general to vacate the area for a more concentrated defence to the rear.

An officer in Wang Ping's staff said: 

However Wang Ping answered: 

Among Wang Ping's officers, the General Who Protects the Army Liu Min insisted on following the defence arrangements previously set up by Wei Yan (when he was in charge of Hanzhong Commandery) to resist Wei invasions. Wang Ping agreed with Liu Min and ordered the troops to advance to Xingshi and occupy the mountains. Although he had only less than 30,000 troops at the time, the enemy did not know the strength of his army. Liu Min also ordered the Shu troops to erect a flow of flags and streamers across the mountain to create the impression of a larger army. When Cao Shuang led his army far into Shu's territory, Wang Ping's forces held the high ground and the mountains to solidify their defences and therefore stopped their advance. While Cao Shuang was stuck in a dilemma between retreating and attacking, Shu reinforcements led by Fei Yi showed up at Xingshi. Then, Cao Shuang had no choice but to order a retreat just as Wang Ping had originally planned.

Appraisal and death

Chen Shou, who wrote Wang Ping's biography in the Records of the Three Kingdoms (Sanguozhi), appraised him as follows: "Wang Ping was loyal and brave yet lived a strict lifestyle... Along with Huang Quan, Li Hui, Lü Kai, Ma Zhong, Zhang Ni, It was thanks to their qualities that they were all well known through the empire and because they seized the opportunity given to them that they left strong legacies."

As Wang Ping came from a humble background and had spent most of his life in the military, he received very little education. He could not write a single word and could read only a mere 10 words or so. Whenever he needed to write reports, he would dictate it to his clerk yet the reports were all rational and insightful. As he feared that others would ridicule him for his inability to read, he looked down on himself and belittle his own achievements and reputation. However, in his free time; he liked having others read him the Shiji and Hanshu’s various Annals and Biographies and could discuss them fluently.

Wang Ping was known to strictly obey the law and for his discipline; he never cracked jokes. Apart from narrating stories, he hardly spoke and would simply meditate in his command tent from morning until dusk and then fall asleep without the appearance of a military General. Wang Ping's position in the north was comparable to that of Deng Zhi of the east and Ma Zhong of the south. The three of them had great achievements and reputation.

Wang Ping died in 248. His son, Wang Xun, inherited his marquis title and marquisate.

In Romance of the Three Kingdoms
In the 14th-century historical novel Romance of the Three Kingdoms, Wang Ping was given a fictionalised and more prominent role in the Hanzhong Campaign, opposing Xu Huang's tactics and defecting. Xu Huang wanted his army to cross the Han River and battle Liu Bei's forces on the other side. Wang Ping warned that it would be impossible to retreat once they crossed the river, as the river would significantly slow down the retreat and they would be vulnerable to enemy fire. Xu Huang claimed that the soldiers would fight to the death and have no need to retreat if they were in a dire situation (in conjunction with the tactic by legendary Western Han dynasty general Han Xin, where he purposely placed his army near a river in order to unleash their full potential).

Wang Ping then claimed that Han Xin only used that tactic because the opposition had no strategist to see through it, but Liu Bei's army had the support of Zhuge Liang, who would be able to easily see through this tactic. Xu Huang refused to listen and, as expected, suffered great defeat. He asked why Wang Ping did not come to his rescue, and Wang Ping replied, "If I came to rescue you with my portion of the army, then our main camp would have had no protection; I warned you multiple times against crossing the river, but you did not listen, which resulted in this defeat." Xu Huang was greatly angered by this and planned to kill Wang Ping that night. However, the plan was leaked out and Wang Ping set the camp on fire and defected to Liu Bei's side.

Right before Zhuge Liang died, he named Wang Ping, along with Liao Hua, Ma Dai, Zhang Ni and Zhang Yi, as the loyal generals of Shu who should be given greater responsibilities.

See also
 Lists of people of the Three Kingdoms

References

 Chen, Shou (3rd century). Records of the Three Kingdoms (Sanguozhi).
 Luo, Guanzhong (14th century). Romance of the Three Kingdoms (Sanguo Yanyi).
 Pei, Songzhi (5th century). Annotations to Records of the Three Kingdoms (Sanguozhi zhu).

Year of birth unknown
248 deaths
Shu Han generals
Generals under Liu Bei
Generals under Cao Cao
Political office-holders in Shaanxi
Politicians from Dazhou
Shu Han politicians
Han dynasty generals from Sichuan